Curcetti is an Italian surname. Notable people with the surname include:

Gaetano Curcetti (born 1947), Italian boxer
Paolo Curcetti (born 1936), Italian boxer, brother of Gaetano

Italian-language surnames